Căiuți is a commune in Bacău County, Western Moldavia, Romania. It is composed of nine villages: Blidari, Boiștea, Căiuți, Florești, Heltiu, Mărcești, Popeni, Pralea and Vrânceni.

Natives
 Lavinia Agache
 Radu R. Rosetti

References

Communes in Bacău County
Localities in Western Moldavia